Erdapin may refer to:
Artabuynk, Armenia
Yeghegis, Armenia